Kazbek Khazizovich Geteriev (born 30 June 1985) is a Kazakhstani former footballer.

Career

Club
He made his Russian Premier League debut for PFC Spartak Nalchik on 30 June 2007 in a game against FC Luch-Energiya Vladivostok.

International
In 2010, he took the Kazakhstani citizenship to play for the national team.

Career statistics

International

Statistics accurate as of match played 10 October 2015

References

External links

1985 births
Living people
People from Kabardino-Balkaria
Kazakhstani footballers
Kazakhstan international footballers
Kazakhstani expatriate footballers
Russian Premier League players
Kazakhstan Premier League players
Expatriate footballers in Russia
PFC Spartak Nalchik players
FC Zhemchuzhina Sochi players
FC Spartak Vladikavkaz players
FC Irtysh Pavlodar players
FC Okzhetpes players
FC Caspiy players
Association football midfielders